The Pingat Bakti Masyarakat (English: Public Service Medal) is a Singaporean national honour. It was instituted in 1973. The medal may be awarded to any person who has rendered commendable public service in Singapore or for his/her achievement in the field of arts and letters, sports, the sciences, business, the professions and the labour movement.

Recipients are entitled to use the post-nominal letters PBM.

Description
 The medal, in silver, is in the form of a stylised rosette of undulating folds having, on the obverse side, a disc with a bar to each side upon which a circular shield bearing a crescent and 5 stars is embossed. Below it is a scroll with the inscription "PINGAT BAKTI MASYARAKAT" and 2 laurels. 
 The reverse bears the State Arms.
 The ribbon is grey with a white centre band and a red stripe to each side.

See also
:Category:Recipients of the Pingat Bakti Masyarakat

References

External links 
Singapore Prime Minister's Office - The Public Service Medal

Civil awards and decorations of Singapore